Mount Bayonne is a mountain, 1,500 m, forming the north extremity of the Rouen Mountains in Alexander Island, Antarctica. The mountain lies immediately north of Les Dents and Mount Paris. First mapped by the French Antarctic Expedition, 1908–10, under Jean-Baptiste Charcot, who named it for the French city. Resighted from the air by the British Graham Land Expedition (BGLE) in 1936. Remapped from air photos taken by the Ronne Antarctic Research Expedition (RARE), 1947–48, by Searle of the Falkland Islands Dependencies Survey (FIDS) in 1960.

See also

 Beagle Peak
 Mount Huckle
 Mount Phoebe

Mountains of Alexander Island